Johan Ernst Mejdell (1773 - ??) was a Norwegian jurist and politician.

He was elected to the Norwegian Parliament in 1818, representing the constituency of Christians Amt. He was later elected in 1824 from Fredriksstad. He worked as an attorney.

References

1773 births
Year of death missing
Members of the Storting
Oppland politicians
Østfold politicians
Norwegian jurists